The 2017–18 season is Ludogorets Razgrad's seventh consecutive season in the Bulgarian First League, of which they are defending champions. They will also take part in the Bulgarian Cup, Supercup and will enter the UEFA Champions League second qualifying round.

Squad

Out on loan

Transfers

Summer

In:

Out:

Winter

In:

Out:

Friendlies

Competitions

Bulgarian Supercup

A Football Group

Regular stage

League table

Results summary

Results by round

Results

Championship stage

League table

Results summary

Results by round

Results

Bulgarian Cup

UEFA Champions League

Qualifying phase

UEFA Europa League

Play-off round

Group stage

Knockout phase

Squad Statistics

Appearances and goals

|-
|colspan="14"|Players away from the club on loan:

|-
|colspan="14"|Players who appeared for Ludogorets Razgrad that left during the season:

|}

Goal Scorers

Disciplinary Record

References

Ludogorets Razgrad
PFC Ludogorets Razgrad seasons
Ludogorets Razgrad
Bulgarian football championship-winning seasons